The Nepalese cricket team toured the Netherlands from 30 June to 3 July 2015 to play four Twenty20 International (T20I) matches. The Netherlands won the series 3–1. The tour was a warm-up for the 2015 ICC World Twenty20 Qualifier which took place in Ireland later in July.

Squads

T20I series

1st T20I

2nd T20I

3rd T20I

4th T20I

References

External links
 Series home at ESPN Cricinfo

2015 in Dutch cricket
2015 in Nepalese cricket
International cricket competitions in 2015
International cricket tours of the Netherlands
Nepalese cricket tours abroad